The first USS Kangaroo (SP-1284) was an armed motorboat that served in the United States Navy as a patrol vessel from 1917 to 1919.

Construction and commissioning
Kangaroo was built as the private motorboat Herreshoff Hull # 316 in May 1917 by the Herreshoff Manufacturing Company at Bristol, Rhode Island, one of nine identical motor boats built in anticipation of eventual acquisition by the U.S. Navy from their private owners. Her civilian owner, Henry A. Morse of Marblehead, Massachusetts, had named her Kangaroo by the time the U.S. Navy purchased her from him at Boston, Massachusetts, on 18 September 1917 for service as a patrol boat in World War I. She was commissioned on 10 December 1917 as USS Kangaroo (SP-1284).

United States Navy service
Assigned to the 1st Naval District, Kangaroo served on section patrol and inner harbor patrol in Penobscot Bay, Maine, until 14 October 1918, when she departed for Key West, Florida.

Due to an urgent need for craft such as Kangaroo at Brest, France, an order dated 14 October 1918 went out from Washington, D.C., to Boston directing the Commandant of the 1st Naval District to ready six section patrol boats -- USS Commodore (SP-1425), USS Cossack (SP-695), USS War Bug (SP-1795), USS Sea Hawk (SP-2365), Kangaroo, and USS SP-729—to be shipped to France as deck cargo along with spare parts to keep them operational. However, this proposed movement appears to have been cancelled, probably because of the armistice with Germany of 11 November 1918 that ended World War I and eliminated the need for more U.S. Navy patrol craft in Europe.

Instead, Kangaroo arrived at Key West on 12 January 1919. Based there, she performed patrol and dispatch duties along the Florida Keys and in Florida's Atlantic coastal waters.

Kangaroo was decommissioned on 20 May 1919.

Later career

On 22 November 1919, Kangaroo was transferred to the United States Department of the Treasury for use by the United States Coast Guard, which commissioned her as USCGC Kangaroo.  Renamed USCGC AB-6 in 1923, she served in the Coast Guard until sold in 1932.

Notes

References
 for Kangaroo
 for SP-729 (ex-Apache)
Department of the Navy: Naval Historical Center: Online Library of Selected Images: U.S. Navy Ships: USS Kangaroo (SP-1284), 1917-1919. Originally civilian motor boat Herreshoff Hull # 316 and Kangaroo (1917)
NavSource Online: Section Patrol Craft Photo Archive Kangaroo (SP 1284)
United States Coast Guard Historian's Office: Kangaroo, 1919 (AB-6)

Patrol vessels of the United States Navy
World War I patrol vessels of the United States
Ships built in Bristol, Rhode Island
1917 ships